Ischiocentra stockwelli is a species of beetle in the family Cerambycidae. It was described by Giesbert in 1984. It is known from Panama and Costa Rica.

References

Onciderini
Beetles described in 1984